Home Place or Homeplace may refer to:

Places

Home Place, Kelling, a house in the United Kingdom
Home Place, Indiana, an unincorporated community
Homeplace Plantation House, a historic house in Louisiana
Homeplace (Washington, Louisiana), listed on the National Register of Historic Places in St. Landry Parish, Louisiana
Home Place (Benton, Mississippi), listed on the National Register of Historic Places in Yazoo County, Mississippi
Homeplace (Frankford, West Virginia), a historic house in West Virginia
The Homeplace, a historic house in Madison County, West Virginia

Other uses
HomePlace (corporation), a subsidiary of the Waccamaw Corp.
 Home Place (Dragonwagon book), a 1990 picture book
The Home Place, a 2005 play

See also
 Domicile (law), place of residence